In botany, perennation is the ability of organisms, particularly plants, to survive from one germinating season to another, especially under unfavourable conditions such as drought or winter. It typically involves development of a perennating organ, which stores enough nutrients to sustain the organism during the unfavourable season, and develops into one or more new plants the following year. Common forms of perennating organs are storage organs (e.g. tubers, rhizomes and corm), and buds. Perennation is closely related with vegetative reproduction, as the organisms commonly use the same organs for both survival and reproduction.

See also
 Overwintering
 Plant pathology
 Sclerotium
 Turion (botany)

References

Agronomy
Botany
Biology terminology